Örjan Thomas Ouchterlony (January 14, 1914, Stockholm – September 25, 2004) was a Swedish bacteriologist and immunologist who is credited with the creation of the Ouchterlony double immuno diffusion test in the 1940s.  He was trained at Karolinska Institute, where his received his medical doctorate. He worked at Sweden's State Bacteriology Laboratory from 1935 to 1952. Ouchterlony was a professor of bacteriology at the Medical Faculty of Gothenburg University from 1952 to 1980 and was elected a member of the Royal Swedish Academy of Sciences in 1968. In addition to his laboratory work, he did research in field epidemiology of infectious diseases and worked and lectured in Africa and the United States, as well as in several countries in Europe. Upon his retirement in 1980, the successor to his professorial chair was Jan Holmgren.

Important works

References

Swedish bacteriologists
Swedish immunologists
Academic staff of the University of Gothenburg
Karolinska Institute alumni
Members of the Royal Swedish Academy of Sciences
1914 births
2004 deaths